Szass Tam is a fictional character in the Forgotten Realms.

Description
Szass Tam is a lich and leader of the Red Wizards of Thay.

Szass Tam is the most powerful of a group of eight zulkirs, or wizards, who rule the country of Thay.  He is the Zulkir of the school of Necromancy.  Tam is a Lich and many of his servants are undead.

Szass Tam is the ruler of Thaymount, however, rumor says that Szass is under the command of Larloch, working on search for artifacts. He attempted to destroy the world and create his own in the year of the Dark Circle (1478 DR), but this plot was foiled.

He makes an appearance in R.A. Salvatore's 2010 book Gauntlgrym.
The Forgotten Realms: The Haunted Lands Series features Szass Tam in his attempt to rule over Thay and Toril.

Unclean (Forgotten Realms: The Haunted Lands, Book 1)
Undead: The Haunted Lands, Book II
Unholy: The Haunted Lands, Book III

Appearances
Whitney-Robinson, Voronica. The Crimson Gold (Wizards of the Coast, 2003).
Donovan, Dale. Villains' Lorebook (TSR, 1998).
Pryor, Anthony. Spellbound (TSR, 1995).
Rabe, Jean. Red Magic (TSR, 1991).

Other media
"Tam has been a prominent antagonist in various Dungeons & Dragons adventures and novels, although his profile is not quite as prominent as the liches Vecna and Acererak". He is set to be the villain of the upcoming film Dungeons & Dragons: Honor Among Thieves (2023).

References

Forgotten Realms characters

fr:Szass Tam